Hauron Peak is a peak,  high, rising  southeast of Mount Banck on the west coast of Graham Land, Antarctica. The peak appears on an Argentine government chart of 1952. It was named by the UK Antarctic Place-Names Committee in 1960 for Louis Arthur Ducos du Hauron, a French pioneer of cinematography, and the first man to lay down the fundamental principles of color photography, in 1869.

References

Mountains of Graham Land
Danco Coast